Klutes Lakes are a pair of lakes in Berrien County, in the U.S. state of Michigan.

Klutes Lakes was named after an original owner of the site.

References

Lakes of Berrien County, Michigan